Pseudobiotus is a genus of water bear or moss piglet, a tardigrade in the class Eutardigrada.

Species
 Pseudobiotus hirsutellus Pilato, Lisi & Binda, 2010
 Pseudobiotus kathmanae Nelson, Marley and Bertolani, 1999
 Pseudobiotus longiunguis (Iharos, 1968)
 Pseudobiotus matici (Pilato, 1971)
 Pseudobiotus megalonyx (Thulin, 1928)
 Pseudobiotus vladimiri Biserov, Dudichev and Biserova, 2001

References

External links

Parachaela
Tardigrade genera
Xerophiles